The 2020 FIM Women's Motocross World Championship was the 16th Women's Motocross World Championship season. Courtney Duncan successfully defended her title, after taking her first title in 2019.

2020 Calendar
A 6-round calendar for the 2019 season was announced on 16 October 2020.

Participants

Riders Championship

Manufacturers Championship

References 

Motocross World Championship seasons
Women's Motocross World